Feed the Beast is an American crime drama television series based on the Danish series Bankerot by Kim Fupz Aakeson and adapted by Clyde Phillips for AMC, starring David Schwimmer and Jim Sturgess. The series premiered on June 5, 2016, on AMC. On September 2, 2016, AMC canceled the show after one season.

Plot 
Tommy Moran and Dion Patras are like brothers. Dion is unable to stay out of trouble and Tommy is unable to move past it. For two friends on the brink of losing everything, a dusty pipe dream of opening an upscale Greek restaurant in their hometown of the Bronx is all they have left to turn their lives around. Together, they take on the insanity of the New York restaurant world and navigate its underbelly of petty criminals, corrupt officials and violent mobsters.

Cast

Main
 David Schwimmer as Thomas "Tommy" Moran, a former sommelier and functional alcoholic who is raising his ten-year-old son, TJ, after the tragic death of his wife, Rie. His dream of opening a restaurant in the Bronx with longtime friend Dion ignites a fire in him that has been absent since his loss.
 Jim Sturgess as Dion Patras, fresh out of prison and in debt to the Polish Mob, is inspired to open his dream restaurant with his childhood friend, Tommy. A rockstar chef, Dion plays a central role in both Tommy and TJ's life, all the while trying to escape his own inner demons and stay the course in his quest to be the best chef in New York.
 Lorenza Izzo as Pilar Herrera, a quirky single woman who meets Tommy in a grief group, desperately searching for true love. Her search for love has inadvertently attracted men who capitalize on her naiveté. But when she meets Tommy, her hopes are restored.
 Michael Gladis as Patrick "The Tooth Fairy" Woichik, a first-generation Polish-American, is a soft-spoken, brutally intimidating local mobster with a penchant for pulling teeth. Though he works for his father, he is also a major disappointment to him.
 John Doman as Aidan Moran, Tommy's father, a shrewd and ruthless businessman and unapologetic racist. He is a provocative and proud Irish-American and a self-made man with a personal code of business ethics, which allows plenty of room for bribery, fraud, extortion, bullying and a general embrace of New York's criminal underworld.
 Christine Adams as Rie Moran, Tommy's late wife, whose African-American roots play a strong role in Tommy's damaged relationship with his father. Remaining present in flashbacks throughout the season, Rie was a talented chef and artistic visionary for the restaurant. Her design book remains a guide for Tommy and Dion. She was a serial optimist who didn't let anyone take her down, especially Tommy's racist father. Her absence is a shroud over all of the characters.
 Elijah Jacob as Thomas "TJ" Moran Jr., Tommy and Rie's ten-year-old biracial son who is traumatized after witnessing his mother's tragic death and is unable to speak. He suffers from frequent nightmares about the accident in fractured images, but he can't piece the whole sequence together. TJ is a gifted artist, and drawing is one of the only ways he can still connect with the world.

Recurring
Michael Rispoli as Guy Giordano, an NYPD detective with a vendetta against the Tooth Fairy
Erin Cummings as Marisa Gallo, Dion's lawyer and Giordano's daughter
Ella Rae Peck as Anna Davis, a counselor at Clay Avenue Middle School
David Patrick Kelly as Ziggy Woichik, the Tooth Fairy's father
Fredric Lehne as Kevin, a chef hired by Aidan
Demosthenes Chrysan as Stavros, Dion's uncle
Jacob Ming-Trent as Mose, a veteran of the war in Afghanistan, a member of Tommy and Pilar's grief group and a Thirio employee
Joel Marsh Garland as Fiasco, one of Dion's friends and a fellow chef
Mousa Kraish as Habib, one of Dion's friends and a fellow chef
Kathryn Kates as Ruth Cline, Aidan's accountant
April Hernandez-Castillo as Blanca Herrera, a restaurant manager and Pilar's older sister
Geoffrey Cantor as Christian, Tommy and Pilar's grief group leader

Episodes

Production 
On June 25, 2015, AMC ordered Clyde Phillips for a 10-episode series Broke based on the Danish series Bankerot by Kim Fupz Aakeson, which Phillips would executive produce. AMC Studios, Lionsgate Television, and Clyde Phillips Productions would produce the series. Henrik Ruben Genz and Malene Blenkov, who have previously produced Bankerot, are also executive producers, with Piv Bernt. The show was renamed to Feed the Beast and announced to start production in February 2016 in New York City, for a May 2016 premiere.

On April 28, 2016, it was announced on the artist's official Facebook page that Sasha Dobson would perform the opening theme song for the series.

On September 2, 2016, AMC cancelled the show after one season.

Reception
On Rotten Tomatoes the series has a rating of 23%, based on 39 reviews, with an average rating of 5.1/10. The site's critical consensus reads, "Feed the Beasts visual appeal isn't enough to make up for predictable plotting, convoluted dialogue and unlikable characters." On Metacritic the series has a score of 46 out of 100, based on 33 critics, indicating "mixed or average reviews".

References

External links
 
 

2016 American television series debuts
2016 American television series endings
2010s American crime drama television series
AMC (TV channel) original programming
American television series based on Danish television series
English-language television shows
Television series by Lionsgate Television
Television shows set in New York City